Novak Djokovic was the defending champion, but chose not to participate that year.

Unseeded Michaël Llodra won in the final 6–3, 6–4, against third-seeded Jarkko Nieminen.

Seeds

Draw

Finals

Top half

Bottom half

External links
 Draw
 Qualifying draw

Singles
Next Generation Adelaide International
Next Generation Adelaide International - Singles